Dream of a Summer Night (also spelled as Dream of a Summer's Night) is a 1983 Italian  musical film  written and directed by Gabriele Salvatores, at his directorial debut. Based on a rock musical directed by the same Salvatores, it is a musical adaptation of William Shakespeare's A Midsummer Night's Dream. It was screened in the "De Sica" section at the 40th edition of the Venice International Film Festival.

Plot
The wedding day of Teseo and Ippolita, two young heirs of the Milanese bourgeoisie, is near. Everything has been arranged: the party will take place in the splendid family villa in the Lombard plain. Among the guests there are Lisandro, Demetrio, Erminia and Elena, inseparable and involved in a strange relationship made of impulses, tenderness and whims. Meanwhile, in a nearby farmhouse, some guys are trying out the show they will perform during the party. The neighboring forest, however, is populated by elves, fairies and other strange creatures, ruled by King Oberon and his wife Titania, queen of the night. Over the course of the night, the king and his subjects enjoy spying on the four youngsters and pushing them to each other without a reason, thanks to the powerful elixirs given to them by the elf Puck. Only on the wedding day, while the show is going on stage in the big hall, Lisandro, Demetrio, Erminia and Elena will be able to shed light on their true feelings.

Cast 

 Alberto Lionello as Theseus
 Erika Blanc as Hippolyta
 Luca Barbareschi as  Lysander
  Ferdinando Bruni as Puck
 Flavio Bucci as  Oberon
 Alessandro Haber as  Egeus
 Giuseppe Cederna as  Demetrius
 Sabina Vannucchi as  Helena
 Gianna Nannini as Titania
  Augusta Gori  as Hermia 
  Renato Sarti  as  Quince
  Elio De Capitani as  Bottom
 Cristina Crippa as  Shout
  Luca Toracca as  Flute
  Doris von Thury as  Starveling
 Claudio Bisio as  Moth
  Ida Marinelli as Eugenia

See also
 List of Italian films of 1983

References

External links

  

1980s musical films
Films directed by Gabriele Salvatores
Italian musical films
Films based on A Midsummer Night's Dream
Films based on musicals
1980s Italian-language films
1980s Italian films